The 1947 Texas Longhorns baseball team represented the University of Texas in the 1947 NCAA baseball season. The Longhorns played their home games at Clark Field. The team was coached by Bibb Falk in his 5th season at Texas.

The Longhorns were invited to the inaugural NCAA baseball tournament, falling in the final of the Western playoff to eventual College World Series champion California.

Roster

Schedule

References

Texas Longhorns baseball seasons
Texas Longhorns
Southwest Conference baseball champion seasons
Texas Longhorns
Texas